In linguistics, reduplication is a morphological process in which the root or stem of a word (or part of it) or even the whole word is repeated exactly or with a slight change.

The classic observation on the semantics of reduplication is Edward Sapir's: "generally employed, with self-evident symbolism, to indicate  such concepts as distribution, plurality, repetition, customary activity, increase of size, added intensity, continuance." Reduplication is used in inflections to convey a grammatical function, such as plurality, intensification, etc., and in lexical derivation to create new words. It is often used when a speaker adopts a tone more "expressive" or figurative than ordinary speech and is also often, but not exclusively, iconic in meaning. Reduplication is found in a wide range of languages and language groups, though its level of linguistic productivity varies. Reduplication is found in a wide variety of languages, as exemplified below. Examples of it can be found at least as far back as Sumerian, where it was used in forming some color terms, e.g. babbar "white", kukku "black".

Reduplication is the standard term for this phenomenon in the linguistics literature. Other terms that are occasionally used include cloning, doubling, duplication, repetition, and tautonym when it is used in biological taxonomies, such as Bison bison.

Typological description

Form
Reduplication is often described phonologically in one of two ways: either (1) as reduplicated segments (sequences of consonants/vowels) or (2) as reduplicated prosodic units (syllables or moras). In addition to phonological description, reduplication often needs to be described morphologically as a reduplication of linguistic constituents (i.e. words, stems, roots). As a result, reduplication is interesting theoretically as it involves the interface between phonology and morphology.

The base is the word (or part of the word) that is to be copied. The reduplicated element is called the reduplicant, often abbreviated as RED or sometimes just R.

In reduplication, the reduplicant is most often repeated only once. However, in some languages, reduplication can occur more than once, resulting in a tripled form, and not a duple as in most reduplication. Triplication is the term for this phenomenon of copying two times. Pingelapese has both forms:

Triplication occurs in other languages, e.g. Ewe, Shipibo, Twi, Mokilese, Min Nan (Hokkien), Stau.

Sometimes gemination (i.e. the doubling of consonants or vowels) is considered to be a form of reduplication. The term dupleme has been used (after morpheme) to refer to different types of reduplication that have the same meaning.

Full and partial reduplication
Full reduplication involves a reduplication of the entire word. For example, Kham derives reciprocal forms from reflexive forms by total reduplication:

Another example is from Musqueam Halkomelem "dispositional" aspect formation:

Partial reduplication involves a reduplication of only part of the word. For example, Marshallese forms words meaning 'to wear X' by reduplicating the last consonant-vowel-consonant (CVC) sequence of a base, i.e. base+CVC:

Many languages often use both full and partial reduplication, as in the Motu example below:

Reduplicant position
Reduplication may be initial (i.e. prefixal), final (i.e. suffixal), or internal (i.e. infixal), e.g.

Initial reduplication in Agta (CV- prefix):

Final reduplication in Dakota (-CCV suffix):

Internal reduplication in Samoan (-CV- infix):

Internal reduplication is much less common than the initial and final types.

Copying direction
A reduplicant can copy from either the left edge of a word (left-to-right copying) or from the right edge (right-to-left copying). There is a tendency for prefixing reduplicants to copy left-to-right and for suffixing reduplicants to copy right-to-left:

Initial L → R copying in Oykangand Kunjen (a Pama–Nyungan language of Australia):

Final R → L copying in Sirionó:

Copying from the other direction is possible although less common:

Initial R → L copying in Tillamook:

Final L → R copying in Chukchi:

Internal reduplication can also involve copying the beginning or end of the base. In Quileute, the first consonant of the base is copied and inserted after the first vowel of the base.

Internal L → R copying in Quileute:

In Temiar, the last consonant of the root is copied and inserted before the medial consonant of the root.

Internal R → L copying in Temiar (an Austroasiatic language of Malaysia):

A rare type of reduplication is found in Semai (an Austroasiatic language of Malaysia). "Expressive minor reduplication" is formed with an initial reduplicant that copies the first and last segment of the base:

Reduplication and other morphological processes

All of the examples above consist of only reduplication.  However, reduplication often occurs with other phonological and morphological process, such as vowel alternation, deletion, affixation of non-reduplicating material, etc.

For instance, in Tz'utujil a new '-ish' adjective form is derived from other words by suffixing the reduplicated first consonant of the base followed by the segment . Below are some examples:

  'red' →  'reddish'  
  'yellow' →  'yellowish'  
  'water' →  'watery'     (Dayley 1985)

Somali has a similar suffix that is used in forming the plural of some nouns: -aC (where C is the last consonant of the base):

  'ditch' →  'ditches'  
  'lump of meat' →  'lumps of meat'  
  'boy' →  'boys'     (Abraham 1964)

This combination of reduplication and affixation is commonly referred to as fixed-segment reduplication.

In Tohono O'odham initial reduplication also involves gemination of the first consonant in the distributive plural and in repetitive verbs:

  'ox' →  'ox (distributive)'  (no-n-nowiu)
  'rock' →  'rock (distributive)'  (ho-h-hodai)
  'dig out of ground (unitative)' →  'dig out of ground (repetitive)'  (ko-k-kow)
  'hit (unitative)' →  'hit (repetitive)'     (Haugen forthcoming)

Sometimes gemination can be analyzed as a type of reduplication.

Phonological processes, environment, and reduplicant-base relations

 overapplication
 underapplication
 backcopying – A putative phenomenon of over-application in the reduplicant of a process triggered by the reduplicant in the base
 base-reduplicant "identity" (OT terminology: BR-faithfulness)
 tonal transfer/non-transfer

Function and meaning
In the Malayo-Polynesian family, reduplication is used to form plurals (among many other functions):
Malay rumah "house", rumah-rumah "houses".

In pre-1972 Indonesian and Malaysian orthography, 2 was shorthand for the reduplication that forms plurals: orang "person", orang-orang or orang2 "people". This orthography has resurfaced widely in text messaging and other forms of electronic communication.

The Nama language uses reduplication to increase the force of a verb: go, "look;", go-go "examine with attention".

Chinese also uses reduplication:  rén for "person",  rénrén for "everybody". Japanese does it too:  toki "time", tokidoki  "sometimes, from time to time".  Both languages can use a special written iteration mark  to indicate reduplication, although in Chinese the iteration mark is no longer used in standard writing and is often found only in calligraphy.

Indo-European languages formerly used reduplication to form a number of verb forms, especially in the preterite or perfect.  In the older Indo-European languages, many such verbs survive:

spondeo, spopondi (Latin, "I vow, I vowed")
  (Greek, "I leave, I left")
  (Greek, "I see, I saw"; these Greek examples exhibit ablaut as well as reduplication)
háitan, haíháit (Gothic, "to name, I named")

Those forms do not survive in Modern English but existed in its parent Germanic languages. Many verbs in the Indo-European languages exhibit reduplication in the present stem, rather than the perfect stem, often with a different vowel from that used for the perfect: Latin gigno, genui ("I beget, I begat") and Greek τίθημι, ἔθηκα, τέθηκα (I place, I placed, I have placed). Other Indo-European verbs used reduplication as a derivational process: compare Latin sto ("I stand") and sisto ("I remain"). All of those Indo-European inherited reduplicating forms are subject to reduction by other phonological laws.

Reduplication can be used to refer to the most prototypical instance of a word's meaning. In such a case, it is called contrastive focus reduplication. Finnish colloquial speech uses the process; nouns can be reduplicated to indicate genuinity, completeness, originality and being uncomplicated, as opposed to being fake, incomplete, complicated or fussy. It can be thought as compound word formation. For example, Söin jäätelöä ja karkkia, sekä tietysti ruokaruokaa. "I ate ice cream and candy, and of course food-food". Here, "food-food" is contrasted to "junk-food". One may say, "En ollut eilen koulussa, koska olin kipeä. Siis kipeäkipeä" ("I wasn't at school yesterday because I was sick. Sick-sick, that is"); that means that one was actually suffering from an illness instead of making up excuses, as usual.

 ruoka "food", ruokaruoka "proper food", as opposed to snacks
 peli "game", pelipeli "complete game", as opposed to a mod
 puhelin "phone", puhelinpuhelin "phone for talking", as opposed to a pocket computer
 kauas "far away", kauaskauas "unquestionably far away"
 koti "home", kotikoti "home of your parents", as opposed to one's current place of residence

Words can be reduplicated with their case morphemes, as in lomalla lomalla, where the adessive morpheme (--lla) appears twice. While reduplication is intelligible to most Finns, its usage is confined mostly to subgroups of young women and children (and possibly fathers of young children when they talk to their children). However, most young women and children do not use reduplication. Reduplication has a somewhat childish connotation and may be perceived as annoying.

In Swiss German, the verbs gah or goh "go", cho "come", la or lo "let" and aafa or aafo "begin" reduplicate when they are combined with other verbs.

In some Salishan languages, reduplication can mark both diminution and plurality, with one process being applied to each end of the word, as in the following example from Shuswap. Note that the transcription is not comparable to the IPA, but the reduplication of both initial and final portions of the root is clear: ṣōk!Emē'’n 'knife' reduplicated as ṣuk!ṣuk!Emen'’me’n 'plural small knives' (Haeberlin 1918:159). Reduplication has been found to be a major part of Salish languages.

Reduplicative babbling in child language acquisition
At 25–50 weeks after birth, typically developing infants go through a stage of reduplicated or canonical babbling (Stark 198, Oller, 1980). Canonical babbling is characterized by repetition of identical or nearly identical consonant-vowel combinations, such as nanana or idididi. It appears as a progression of language development as infants experiment with their vocal apparatus and home in on the sounds used in their native language. Canonical/reduplicated babbling also appears at a time when general rhythmic behavior, such as rhythmic hand movements and rhythmic kicking, appear. Canonical babbling is distinguished from earlier syllabic and vocal play, which has less structure.

Examples

Indo-European

Proto-Indo-European
The Proto-Indo-European language used partial reduplication of a consonant and e in many stative aspect verb forms. The perfect or preterite (past) tense of some Ancient Greek, Gothic, Latin, Sanskrit, Old Irish, and Old Norse verbs preserve this reduplication:
 Ancient Greek  lúō 'I free' vs.  léluka "I have freed"
 Gothic hald "I hold" vs. haíhald (hĕhald) "I/he held"
 Latin  "I run" vs.  "I ran" or "have run"
 Old Irish  "it breaks" vs.  "it broke"
 Old Norse rœ "I row" vs. rera (røra) "I rowed"
 Sanskrit  likhati 'he writes' vs.  lilekha "he has written" or "he wrote"
 A rare modern English reflex is do vs. did

Proto-Indo-European also used reduplication for the imperfective aspect. Ancient Greek preserves this reduplication in the present tense of some verbs. Usually, but not always, this is reduplication of a consonant and i, and contrasts with e-reduplication in the perfect:

 dídōmi "I give" (present)
 dédōka "I have given" (perfect)
 * sísdō →  hízō "I set" (present)
 * sésdomai →  hézomai "I sit down" (present; from sd-, zero-grade of root in *sed-os → ἕδος hédos "seat, abode")

Reduplication in nouns was rare, the best example being Proto-Indo-European  'wheel' (cf. Lithuanian kãklas 'neck', Sanskrit cakrá 'wheel', Greek κύκλος (kýklos) 'circle'), which doubled *kʷel-o- (cf. Old Prussian kelan 'wheel', Welsh pêl 'ball'), itself likely a deverbative of *kʷelh₁- 'to turn'.

English
English has several types of reduplication, ranging from informal expressive vocabulary (the first four forms below) to grammatically meaningful forms (the last two below). See also the alliteration section of the irreversible binomial article for cases like flip-flop, dribs and drabs, etc.

 Rhyming reduplication: Boogie-woogie, easy-peasy, hanky-panky, hocus-pocus, hoity-toity, hokey-pokey, hurdy-gurdy, itsy-bitsy, namby-pamby, raggle-taggle, ragtag, razzle-dazzle, super-duper, teenie-weenie, willy-nilly, wingding.
 Exact reduplications: Ack ack, aye-aye, back-to-back, blah-blah, boo-boo, bye-bye, chin-chin, choo-choo, chow-chow, dik-dik, doo-doo, fifty-fifty, gogo, ha ha, half-and-half, honk-honk, housey-housey, juju, klop-klop, mama, muumuu, night-night, no-no, papa, pee-pee, pip-pip, pom-pom, poo-poo, pooh-pooh, putt putt, so-so, ta-ta, tut-tut, tutu, wah-wah, wee-wee, yo-yo. While in many forms of English, exact reduplications can also be used to emphasise the strength of a word ("He wants it now now"), in South African English, 'now-now' means 'relatively soon'.
 lexical reduplication: 'Each-each boy take one-one chair.' Indian English
 Ablaut reduplications: In ablaut reduplications, the first vowel is almost always a high vowel (typically ɪ as in hit) and the reduplicated vowel is a low vowel (typically æ as in cat or ɒ as in top). Examples include: bric-a-brac, chit-chat, clip-clop, ding-dong, flimflam, flip-flop, hip-hop, jibber-jabber, kitty-cat, knick-knack, mishmash, ping-pong, pitter-patter, riffraff, sing-song, slipslop, splish-splash, tick-tock, ticky-tacky, tip-top, whiff-whaff, wibble-wobble, wishy-washy, zig-zag.  Three-part ablaut sequences are less numerous, but are attested, e.g. tic-tac-toe, bing-bang-boom, bish-bash-bosh, splish-splash-splosh and "Live, Laugh, Love". Spike Milligan's poem On the Ning Nang Nong achieves comic effect by varying the ordering of vowels in such triples: There's a Nong Nang Ning/Where the trees go Ping!.
 Shm-reduplication can be used with most any word; e.g. baby-shmaby, cancer-shmancer and fancy-shmancy. This process is a feature of American English from Yiddish, starting among the American Jews of New York City, then the New York dialect and then the whole country.

Of the above types, only shm-reduplication is productive, meaning that examples of the first three are fixed forms and new forms are not easily accepted.

 Comparative reduplication: In the sentence "John's apple looked redder and redder," the reduplication of the comparative indicates that the comparative is becoming more true over time, meaning roughly "John's apple looked progressively redder as time went on."  In particular, this construction does  mean that John's apple is redder than some other apple, which would be a possible interpretation in the absence of reduplication, e.g. in "John's apple looked redder."  With reduplication, the comparison is of the object being compared to itself over time.  Comparative reduplication always combines the reduplicated comparative with "and".  This construction is common in speech and is used even in formal speech settings, but it is less common in formal written texts.  Although English has simple constructs with similar meanings, such as "John's apple looked ever redder," these simpler constructs are rarely used in comparison with the reduplicative form.  Comparative reduplication is fully productive and clearly changes the meaning of any comparative to a temporal one, despite the absence of any time-related words in the construction.  For example, the temporal meaning of "The frug seemed wuggier and wuggier" is clear: despite not knowing what a frug is or what wugginess is, it is easy to grasp that the apparent wugginess of the frug was increasing over time, as indicated by the reduplication of the comparative "wuggier".
 Contrastive focus reduplication: Exact reduplication can be used with contrastive focus (generally where the first noun is stressed) to indicate a literal, as opposed to figurative, example of a noun, or perhaps a sort of Platonic ideal of the noun, as in "Is that carrot cheesecake or carrot CAKE-cake?". This is similar to the Finnish use mentioned above. Furthermore, it is used to contrast "real" or "pure" things against imitations or less pure forms. For example, at a coffee shop one may be asked, "Do you want soy milk?" and respond, "No, I want milk milk." This gives the idea that they want "real" milk.

The double copula is in some cases a type of reduplication, which may be regarded as non-standard or incorrect.

Dutch

While not common in Dutch, reduplication does exist. Most, but not all (e.g., pipi, blauwblauw (laten), taaitaai (gingerbread)) reduplications in Dutch are loanwords (e.g., koeskoes, bonbon, (ik hoorde het) via via) or imitative (e.g., tamtam, tomtom). Another example is a former safe sex campaign slogan in Flanders: Eerst bla-bla, dan boem-boem (First talk, then have sex; lit. First blah-blah, then boom-boom). In Dutch the verb "gaan" (to go) can be used as an auxiliary verb, which can lead to a triplication: we gaan (eens) gaan gaan (we are going to get going). The use of gaan as an auxiliary verb with itself is considered incorrect, but is commonly used in Flanders. Numerous examples of reduplication in Dutch (and other languages) are discussed by Daniëls (2000).

Afrikaans
Afrikaans makes use of reduplication to emphasize the meaning of the word repeated and to denote a plural or event happening in more than one place. For example, krap means "to scratch one's self," while krap-krap-krap means "to scratch one's self vigorously", whereas "dit het plek-plek gereën" means "it rained here and there". Further examples of this include: "koes" (to dodge) being reduplicated in the sentence "Piet hardloop koes-koes weg" (Piet is running away while constantly dodging / cringing); "sukkel" (to struggle) becoming "sukkel-sukkel" (making slow progress; struggling on); and "kierang" (to cheat) becoming "kierang-kierang" to indicate being cheated on repeatedly.

Romance languages
In Italian reduplication was used both to create new words or word associations (tran-tran, via via, leccalecca) and to intensify the meaning (piano piano "very softly").

Common in Lingua Franca, particularly but not exclusively for onomatopoeic action descriptions:
"Spagnoli venir...boum boum...andar; Inglis venir...boum boum bezef...andar; Francés venir...tru tru tru...chapar." ("The Spaniards came, cannonaded, and left. The English came, cannonaded heavily, and left. The French came, trumpeted on bugles, and captured it.")

Common uses for reduplication in French are the creation of hypocoristics for names, whereby Louise becomes Loulou, and Zinedine Zidane becomes Zizou; and in many nursery words, like dada 'horsie' (vs. cheval 'horse'), tati 'auntie' (vs. tante 'aunt'), or tonton 'unkie' (vs. oncle 'uncle').

In Romanian and Catalan, reduplication is not uncommon and it has been used for both the creation of new words (including many from onomatopoeia) and expressions, for example,
Romanian: mormăi, ţurţur, dârdâi, expressions talmeş-balmeş, harcea-parcea, terchea-berchea, ţac-pac, calea-valea, hodoronc-tronc.
Catalan: balandrim-balandram, baliga-balaga, banzim-banzam, barliqui-barloqui, barrija-barreja, bitllo-bitllo, bub-bub, bum-bum, but-but, catric-catrac, cloc-cloc, cloc-piu, corre-corrents, de nyigui-nyogui, farrigo-farrago, flist-flast, fru-fru, gara-gara, gloc-gloc, gori-gori, leri-leri, nap-buf, ning-nang, ning-ning, non-non, nyam-nyam, nyau-nyau, nyec-nyec, nyeu-nyeu, nyic-nyic, nyigo-nyigo, nyigui-nyogui, passa-passa, pengim-penjam, pif-paf, ping-pong, piu-piu, poti-poti, rau-rau, ringo-rango, rum-rum, taf-taf, tam-tam, tau-tau, tic-tac, tol·le-tol·le, tric-trac, trip-trap, tris-tras, viu-viu, xano-xano, xau-xau, xerric-xerrac, xim-xim, xino-xano, xip-xap, xiu-xiu, xup-xup, zig-zag, ziga-zaga, zim-zam, zing-zing, zub-zub, zum-zum.

In colloquial Mexican Spanish it is common to use reduplicated adverbs such as luego luego (then then) meaning "immediately", or casi casi (almost almost) which intensifies the meaning of 'almost'.

Slavic languages

The reduplication in the Russian language serves for various kinds of intensifying of the meaning and exists in several forms: a hyphenated or repeated word (either exact or inflected reduplication), and forms similar to shm-reduplication.

Celtic languages
Reduplication is a common feature of Irish and includes the examples rírá, ruaille buaille both meaning 'commotion' and fite fuaite meaning 'intertwined'.

Indo-Aryan
Typically all Indo-Aryan languages, like Hindi, Punjabi, Gujarati and Bengali use partial or echoic reduplication in some form or the other. It is usually used to sound casual, or in a suggestive manner. It is often used to mean etcetera. For example, in Hindi, chai-shai (chai means tea, while this phrase means tea or any other supplementary drink or tea along with snacks). Quite common in casual conversations are a few more examples like shopping-wopping, khana-wana.
South Asian Indo Aryan languages are also rich in other forms of reduplication: morphological (expressives), lexical (distributives), and phrasal (aspectual).
morphological:

Reduplication also occurs in the 3rd gaṇa (verb class) of the Sanskrit language: bibheti "he fears", bibharti "he bears", juhoti "he offers", dadāti, "he gives". Even though the general idea is to reduplicate the verb root as a prefix, several sandhi rules change the outcome.

There are a number of constructions in Hindi and Urdu that are constructed by reduplication. Nouns, adjectives, verbs, adverbs, pronouns, all have possibility of reduplications.

Armenian

In Armenian, reduplication follows the same classification as in Turkish (see below), namely emphatic reduplication, echo reduplication, and doubling. Many appear as lexical entries in Armenian lexicographical sources.
 Emphatic reduplication, one of two interpolated consonants (փ, ս), as in կարմիր (red), which becomes կասկարմիր (very red). 
 Echo Reduplication, as in սեղան-մեղան (table schmable). 
 Doubling, as in քիչ-քիչ (little [by] little)

Turkish
In Turkish, there are three kinds of reduplication.

 Emphatic Reduplication: A word can be reduplicated partially, such that an emphatic stem is created to be attached to the adjective. This is done by taking the first syllable of the adjective, dropping the syllable-final phoneme, and adding one of four interpolated consonants (p, s, m, r). For example, kırmızı (red) becomes kıpkırmızı (very red); mavi (blue) becomes masmavi (very blue); yeşil (green) becomes yemyeşil (very green), and temiz (clean) becomes tertemiz ("spotless"). However, the consonant added to the emphatic stem is unpredictable grammatically speaking, however phonological studies, such as Wedel (1999) do shed new light on the subject.
 Echo Reduplication: A word can be reduplicated while replacing the initial consonants (not being m, and possibly missing) with m. The effect is that the meaning of the original word is broadened. For example, tabak means "plate(s)", and tabak mabak then means "plates, dishes and such". This can be applied not only to nouns but to all kinds of words, as in yeşil meşil meaning "green, greenish, whatever". Although not used in formal written Turkish, it is a completely standard and fully accepted construction.
 Doubling: A word can be reduplicated totally, giving a related but different meaning or used for emphasizing. For example, zaman zaman (time time) meaning "occasionally"; uzun uzun (long long) meaning "very long or many things long". This type is used also in formal Turkish, especially in literature. There are a lot of reduplications in this category which do not, if used as one word, have a place in the Turkish language's vocabulary but is used solely in this way. These words are called mimetic in linguistics. An example is 'şırıl şırıl' (used for the sound of a waterfall). They try to give sounds to not only audible but also non-audible phenomena. For example, 'mışıl mışıl' is used for sleeping soundly.

Dravidian
Reduplication is also used in Dravidian languages like Telugu for the same purpose.

 phrasal:

Bantu
Reduplication is a common phenomenon in Bantu languages and is usually used to form a frequentive verb or for emphasis.
 Swahili piga 'to strike'; pigapiga 'to strike repeatedly'
 Ganda okukuba (oku-kuba) 'to strike'; okukubaakuba (oku-kuba-kuba) 'to strike repeatedly, to batter'
 Chewa tambalalá 'to stretch one's legs'; tambalalá-tambalalá to stretch one's legs repeatedly'
Popular names that have reduplication include
 Bafana Bafana
 Chipolopolo
 Eric Djemba-Djemba
 Lomana LuaLua
 Ngorongoro

Semitic
Semitic languages frequently reduplicate consonants, though often not the vowels that appear next to the consonants in some verb form. This can take the shape of reduplicating the antepenultimate consonant (usually the second of three), the last of two consonants, or the last two consonants.

Hebrew
In Hebrew, reduplication is used in nouns, adjectives, adverbs and verbs for various reasons:

 For emphasis: in  le'at le'at, where the adverb  "slowly" is duplicated to mean "very slowly". In the slangism  gever gever, the noun  "man" is duplicated to mean a "very manly man".
 To mean "one by one":
  yom yom is based on  "day", and means "every day, day by day".
   para para is based on  "cow", and literally means "cow by cow", referring to "one thing at a time". This is possibly a folk etymology, and a derivation from Spanish "para" meaning "stop" is possible.
 To create a diminutive: by reduplicating the last two consonants (bi-consonantal reduplication):
  kelev "dog"
  klavlav "puppy"
  khatul "cat"
  khataltul "kitten"
  lavan "white"
  levanban "whitish"
  katan "small"
  ktantan "tiny"
 To create secondary derivative verbs: by reduplicating the root or part of it:
 dal "poor" > dilel "to dilute", and also dildel "to impoverish, weaken".
 nad "to move, nod"' > nadad "to wander" but also nidned "to swing" and - due to phono-semantic matching of the Yiddish  lexical item נודיען nídyen / núdzhen "to bore, bother" - also "to bother, pest, nag, annoy".
 tzakhak "to laugh" > tzikhkek "to chuckle".
 For onomatopoeia:
 שקשק shikshék "to make noise, rustle".
 רשרש rishrésh "to make noise, rustle".

Amharic
In Amharic, verb roots can be reduplicated three different ways. These can result in verbs, nouns, or adjectives (which are often derived from verbs).

From the root sbr 'break', antepenultimate reduplication produces täsäbabbärä 'it was shattered' and biconsonantal reduplication produces täsbäräbbärä 'it was shattered repeatedly' and səbərbari 'a shard, a shattered piece'.

From the root kHb 'pile stones into a wall', since the second radical is not fully specified, what some call "hollow", the antepenultimate reduplication process reduplicates the k inserting the vowel a along with the consonant as a place holder for the hollow consonant, which is by some criteria antepenultimate, and produces akakabä 'pile stones repeatedly'.

Japanese
A small number of native Japanese nouns have collective forms produced by reduplication (possibly with rendaku), such as 人々 hitobito "people" (h → b is rendaku) – these are written with the iteration mark "々" to indicate duplication.  This formation is not productive and is limited to a small set of nouns.  Similarly to Standard Chinese, the meaning is not that of a true plural, but collectives that refer to a large, given set of the same object; for example, the formal English equivalent of 人々 would be "people" (collective), rather than "persons" (plural individuals).

Japanese also contains a large number of mimetic words formed by reduplication of a syllable.  These words include not only onomatopoeia, but also words intended to invoke non-auditory senses or psychological states, such as きらきら kirakira (sparkling or shining). By one count, approximately 43% of Japanese mimetic words are formed by full reduplication, and many others are formed by partial reduplication, as in がささ〜 ga-sa-sa- (rustling) – compare English "a-ha-ha-ha".

Austronesian
Austronesian languages are known for their extensive use of reduplication in both nouns and verbs.

Malay (Indonesian and Malaysian)
In the Malay language, reduplication is a semi-productive process. It is used for expression of various grammatical functions (such as verbal aspect) and it is part in a number of complex morphological models. Simple reduplication of nouns and pronouns can express at least three meanings:

Diversity or non-exhaustive plurality:
Burung-burung itu juga diekspor ke luar negeri = "All those birds are also exported out of the country".
Conceptual similarity:
langit-langit = "ceiling; palate; etc." (langit = "sky")
jari-jari = "spoke; bar; radius; etc." (jari = "finger" etc.)
Pragmatic accentuation:
Saya bukan anak-anak lagi! "I am not a child anymore!" (anak = "child")

Reduplication of an adjective can express different things:
Adverbialisation: Jangan bicara keras-keras! = "Don't speak loudly!" (keras = hard)
Plurality of the corresponding noun: Rumah di sini besar-besar = "The houses here are big" (besar = "big").

Reduplication of a verb can express various things:
Simple reduplication:
Pragmatic accentuation: Kenapa orang tidak datang-datang? = "Why aren't people coming?"
Reduplication with me- prefixation, depending on the position of the prefix me-:
Repetition or continuation of the action: Orang itu memukul-mukul anaknya: "That man continuously beat his child";
Reciprocity: Kedua orang itu pukul-memukul = "Those two men would beat each other".
Notice that in the first case, the nasalisation of the initial consonant (whereby /p/ becomes /m/) is repeated, while in the second case, it only applies in the repeated word.

Māori
The Māori language (New Zealand) uses reduplication in a number of ways.

Reduplication can convey a simple plural meaning, for instance wahine "woman", waahine "women", tangata "person", taangata "people". Biggs calls this "infixed reduplication". It occurs in a small subset of "people" words in most Polynesian languages.

Reduplication can convey emphasis or repetition, for example mate "die", matemate "die in numbers"; and de-emphasis, for example wera "hot" and werawera "warm".

Reduplication can also extend the meaning of a word; for instance paki "pat" becomes papaki "slap or clap once" and pakipaki "applaud"; kimo "blink" becomes kikimo "close eyes firmly"

Mortlockese 
The Mortlockese language is a Micronesian language spoken primarily on the Mortlock Islands. In the Mortlockese language, reduplication is used to show a habitual or imperfective aspect. For example, /jææjæ/ means "to use something" while the word /jæjjææjæ/ means "to use something habitually or repeatedly". Reduplication is also used in the Mortlockese Language to show extremity or extreme measures. One example of this can be seen in /ŋiimw alɛɛtɛj/ which means "hate him, her, or it". To mean "really hate him, her, or it," the phrase changes to /ŋii~mw al~mw alɛɛtɛj/.

Pingelapese
Pingelapese is a Micronesian language spoken on the Pingelap atoll and on two of the eastern Caroline Islands, called the high island of Pohnpei. Pingelapese utilizes both duplication and triplication of a verb or part of a verb to express that something is happening for certain duration of time. No reduplication means that something happens. A reduplicated verb means that something IS happening, and a triplication means that something is STILL happening.  For example, saeng means 'to cry' in Pingelapese. When reduplicated and triplicated, the duration of this verb is changed:
 saeng – cries
 saeng-saeng – is crying
 saeng-saeng-saeng – is still crying

Few languages employ triplication in their language. In Micronesia, Pingelapese is one of only two languages that uses triplication, the other being Mokilese. Reduplication and triplication are not to be confused with tense however. In order to make a phrase past, present, or future tense, a temporal phrase must be used.

Rapa 
Rapa is the French Polynesian language of the island of Rapa Iti. In terms of reduplication, the indigenous language known as Old Rapa uses reduplication consistent to other Polynesian languages. Reduplication of Old Rapa occurs in four ways: full, rightward, leftward, and medial. Full and rightward are generally more frequently used as opposed to the leftward and medial. Leftward and medial only occur as CV reduplication and partial leftward and medial usually denote emphasis.

Example of Reduplication Forms:

For the Rapa Language the implementation of reduplication has specific implications. The most evident of these are known as iterative, intensification, specification, diminutive, metaphorical, nominalizing, and adjectival.

Iterative:

 naku 'come, go' → nakunaku 'pass by frequently'
 ipuni 'hide' → ipunipuni 'hide and seek'

Intensification:

 mare 'cough' → maremare 'cough forcefully'
 roa 'much' → roroa 'very much'
 maki 'sick'makimaki 'really sick'

Specification:

 kini 'to pinch' → kinikini 'pinch skin'

Diminutive:

 paki 'slap, strike'pakipaki 'clap'
 kati 'bite' → katikati 'nibble'

Metaphorical (typically comparing an animal action with a human action):

 kapa 'mime with hands' → kapakapa 'flap wings (a bird)'
 mākuru 'detach oneself' → mākurukuru 'shed or molt'
 taŋi 'Yell' → taŋitaŋi 'chirp (a bird)'

Nominalizing:

 para 'Finished'parapara 'leftovers'
 Panga'a 'divide' → panaga'anga'a 'a break, a divide'

Adjectival:

 repo 'dirt, earth' → reporepo 'dirty'
 pake 'sun' → pakepake 'shining, bright'

Tagalog
Philippine languages are characterized as having the most productive use of reduplication, especially in Tagalog (the basis of the Filipino language). Reduplication in Tagalog is complex. It can be roughly divided into six types:
Monosyllabic; e.g. olol ("mad")
Reduplication of the final syllable; e.g. himaymay ("separate meat from bones"), from himay (same meaning)
Reduplication of the final syllable of a disyllabic word, where the added syllable is created from the first consonant of the first syllable and the last consonant of the second syllable; e.g. kaliskis ("[fish] scale"), from kalis ("to scrape")
Reduplication of the initial syllable of the root; e.g. susulat ("will write"), from sulat ("to write")
Full reduplication; e.g. araw-araw ("every day"), from araw ("day" or "sun")
Combined partial and full reduplication; e.g. babalibaligtad ("turning around continually", "tumbling"), from baligtad ("reverse")

They can further be divided into "non-significant" (where its significance is not apparent) and "significant" reduplication. 1, 2, and 3 are always non-significant; while 5 and 6 are always significant. 4 can be non-significant when used for nouns (e.g. lalaki, "man").

Full or partial reduplication among nouns and pronouns can indicate emphasis, intensity, plurality, or causation; as well as a diminutive, superlative, iterative, restrictive, or distributive force.

Adjectives and adverbs employ morphological reduplication for many different reasons such as number agreement when the adjective modifies a plural noun, intensification of the adjective or adverb, and sometimes because the prefix forces the adjective to have a reduplicated stem".

Number agreement for adjectives is entirely optional in Tagalog (e.g., a plural noun does not have to have a plural article marking it):
"Ang magandang puno" "the beautiful tree".
"Ang magagandang puno" "the beautiful trees".

The entire adjective is repeated for intensification of adjectives or adverbs:
Magandang maganda ang kabayo "the horse is very pretty"

In verbs, reduplication of the root, prefix or infix is employed to convey different grammatical aspects. In "Mag- verbs" reduplication of the root after the prefix "mag-" or "nag-" changes the verb from the infinitive form, or perfective aspect, respectively, to the contemplated or imperfective aspect. Thus:
magluto inf/actor trigger-cook "to cook" or "cook!" (imperative) 
nagluto actor trigger-cook "cooked"
nagluluto actor trigger-reduplication-cook "cook" (as in "I cook all the time) or "is/was cooking"
magluluto inf/actor trigger-rdplc-cook (contemplated) "will cook"

For ergative verbs (frequently referred to as "object focus" verbs) reduplication of part the infix and the stem occur:
lutuin cook-inf/object trigger-cook "to cook"
niluto object trigger infix-cook (perf-cook) "cooked"
niluluto object trigger infix-reduplication-cook "cook"/"is/was cooking"
lulutuin rdp-cook-object trigger "will cook".

The complete superlative prefix pagka- demands reduplication of the first syllable of the adjective's stem:
"Ang pagkagagandang puno" "The most beautiful tree (and there are none more beautiful anywhere)"

Wuvulu-Aua
Reduplication is not a productive noun derivation process in Wuvulu-Aua as it is in other Austronesian languages. Some nouns exhibit reduplication, though they are considered to be fossilized.

Verb roots can undergo whole or partial reduplication to mark aspect. Actions that are continuous are indicated by a reduplicated initial syllable. A whole reduplication can also be used to indicate imperfective aspect.
 "roni" "to hurry"
 "roroni" "hurrying"
 "rawani" "good"
 "rarawani" "good" (continuous)
 "ware" "talk"
 "wareware" "talked" (durative)

The onomatopoeia in Wuvulu language also uses reduplication to describe the sound. These onomatopoeic words can be used as alienable nouns. 
 "baʔa" or "baʔabaʔa" is a word for the sound of knocking.

Austroasiatic

Vietnamese

Sino-Tibetan

Burmese 
As in many Tibeto-Burman languages, in Burmese, reduplication is used in verbs and adjectives to form adverbs. This is also true of many Burmese verbs, which become adverbs when reduplicated.

Some nouns are also reduplicated to indicate plurality.

A few measure words can also be reduplicated to indicate "one or the other":

  (measure word for people) →  (someone)
  (measure word for things) →  (something)

Chinese
Reduplication is sometimes employed in verbs and adjectives to enhance the effect of them.

 帮帮忙 bāng bāng máng ("Please help!") is a reduplicated form of 帮忙 bāngmáng ("to help")
 胖胖的 pàng pàng de ("quite fat") from 胖 pàng ("fat")

Similar to other Sino-Tibetan languages, adjectives form adverbs by reduplication.

 漂漂亮亮 piào piào liàng liàng ("prettily") is a reduplicated form of 漂亮 piàoliàng ("pretty")

Other than verbs and adjectives, some nouns can be reduplicated to express plurality or a collection in Chinese.

 人人 rén rén ("everyone") is derived from 人 rén ("person").

See also
 Ideophone
 Augment (Bantu languages)
 Augment (Indo-European)
 Amredita
 Language acquisition
 Siamese twins (linguistics)
 Syntactic doubling
 Motherese
 For an example of a language with many types of reduplication see: St'at'imcets language#Reduplication.
 Contrastive focus reduplication
 Shm-reduplication
 Repetition (rhetorical device)
 Redundancy (linguistics)
 List of reduplicated place names
 List of people with reduplicated names

Notes

Citations

 
 
 
 
 
 
 
 
 
 
 
 
 
  Print.
 
 
 
 
 
 
 
 
 
 
 
 
 
 
 
 
 
 
 
 
 
 
 
 
 
  Print.

References

 Abraham, Roy. (1964). Somali-English dictionary.  London, England: University of London Press.
 Albright, Adam. (2002). A restricted model of UR discovery: Evidence from Lakhota. (Draft version).
 
 
 
 Dayley, Jon P. (1985). Tzutujil grammar. Berkeley, CA: University of California Press.
 Diffloth, Gérald. (1973). Expressives in Semai. In P. N. Jenner, L. C. Thompson, and S. Starsota (Eds.), Austroasiatic studies part I (pp. 249–264). University Press of Hawaii.
 Fabricius, Anne H. (2006). A comparative survey of reduplication in Australian languages. LINCOM Studies in Australian Languages (No. 03). Lincom. .
 Gomez, Gale Goodwin, and Hein van der Voort, eds. Reduplication in indigenous languages of South America. Brill, 2014.
 
 Haugen, Jason D. (forthcoming). Reduplicative allomorphy and language prehistory in Uto-Aztecan. (Paper presented at Graz Reduplication Conference 2002, November 3–6).
 Harlow, Ray. (2007) Māori: a linguistic introduction Cambridge University Press. . 127–129
 Healey, Phyllis M. (1960). An Agta grammar. Manila: The Institute of National Language and The Summer Institute of Linguistics.
 Hurch, Bernhard (Ed.). (2005). Studies on reduplication. Empirical approaches to language typology (No. 28). Mouton de Gruyter. .
 
 Inkelas, Sharon; & Zoll, Cheryl. (2005). Reduplication: Doubling in morphology. Cambridge studies in linguistics (No. 106). Cambridge University Press. .
 
 
 Marantz, Alec. (1982). Re reduplication. Linguistic Inquiry 13: 435–482.
 McCarthy, John J. and Alan S. Prince. (1986 [1996]). Prosodic morphology 1986. Technical report #32. Rutgers University Center for Cognitive Science. (Unpublished revised version of the 1986 paper available online on McCarthy's website: http://ruccs.rutgers.edu/pub/papers/pm86all.pdf).
 McCarthy, John J.; and Prince, Alan S. (1995). Faithfulness and reduplicative identity. In J. Beckman, S. Urbanczyk, and L. W. Dickey  (Eds.), University of Massachusetts occasional papers in linguistics 18: Papers in optimality theory (pp. 249–384). Amherst, MA: Graduate Linguistics Students Association. (Available online on the Rutgers Optimality Archive website: https://web.archive.org/web/20090423020041/http://roa.rutgers.edu/view.php3?id=568).
 McCarthy, John J.; and Prince, Alan S. (1999). Faithfulness and identity in prosodic morphology. In R. Kager, H. van der Hulst, and W. Zonneveld  (Eds.), The prosody morphology interface (pp. 218–309). Cambridge: Cambridge University Press. (Available online on the Rutgers Optimality Archive website: https://web.archive.org/web/20050525032431/http://roa.rutgers.edu/view.php3?id=562).
 Moravcsik, Edith. (1978). Reduplicative constructions. In J. H. Greenberg (Ed.), Universals of human language: Word structure (Vol. 3, pp. 297–334). Stanford, CA: Stanford University Press.
 
 Oller, D. Kimbrough. 1980. The emergence of the sounds of speech in infancy, in Child Phonology Vol. I, edited by G. H. Yeni-Komshian, J. F. Kavanaugh, and C. A. Ferguson. Academic Press, New York. pp. 93–112.
 
 
 Shaw, Patricia A. (1980). Theoretical Issues in Dakota Phonology and Morphology. Garland Publ: New York. pp. ix + 396.
 Shaw, Patricia A. (2004). Reduplicant order and identity: Never trust a Salish CVC either?. In D. Gerdts and L. Matthewson (Eds.), Studies in Salish linguistics in honor of M. Dale Kinkade. University of Montana Occasional Papers in Linguistics (Vol. 17). Missoula, MT: University of Montana.
 
 
 Watters, David E. (2002). A grammar of Kham. Cambridge grammatical descriptions. Cambridge: Cambridge University Press. .
 Wilbur, Ronnie B. (1973). The phonology of reduplication. Doctoral dissertation, University of Illinois. (Also published by Indiana University Linguistics Club in 1973, republished 1997.)

External links

 Reduplication (Lexicon of Linguistics)
 What is reduplication? (SIL)
 Echo-Word Reduplication Lexicon
 Exhaustive list of reduplications in English
 List of contrastive focus reduplications in English
 List of English reduplications in Wiktionary
 graz database on reduplication (gdr) Institute of Linguistics, University of Graz
 La réduplication à m dans l’arabe parlé à Mardin

 
Grammar
Linguistic morphology
Phonology